Dorothy Michelle Provine (January 20, 1935 – April 25, 2010) was an American singer, dancer and actress. Born in 1935 in Deadwood, South Dakota, she grew up in Seattle, Washington, and was hired in 1958 by Warner Bros., after which she first starred in The Bonnie Parker Story and played many roles in TV series. During the 1960s, Provine starred in series such as The Alaskans and The Roaring Twenties, and her major roles in movies included It's a Mad, Mad, Mad, Mad World (1963), Good Neighbor Sam (1964) with Jack Lemmon, That Darn Cat! (1965), Kiss the Girls and Make Them Die (1966), Who's Minding the Mint? (1967), and Never a Dull Moment (1968) with Dick Van Dyke and Edward G. Robinson. In 1968, Provine married the film and television director Robert Day and mostly retired. She died of emphysema on April 25, 2010 in Bremerton, Washington.

Early life and career

[[File:Roaring 20's cast.JPG|thumb|right|With Donald May and Rex Reason in The Roaring Twenties (1962)]]
Provine was born in Deadwood in southwestern South Dakota, to William and Irene Provine, but grew up in Seattle, Washington, where her parents ran a nightclub. She attended the University of Washington in Seattle, from which she graduated with a degree in Theater Arts in 1957. While there, she joined the women's fraternity Alpha Gamma Delta. In Washington, she handed out prizes for a quiz program on a local television station until she was hired by Warner Bros. at $500 per week. In Hollywood, she starred in the titular role as the cigar-chomping, machine-gun firing heroine of the 1958 film The Bonnie Parker Story directed by William Witney. That same year, she performed in a credited walk-on part in the NBC Western television series Wagon Train, in the episode "The Marie Dupree Story." In 1959, she was in the cast of The 30 Foot Bride of Candy Rock, which was Lou Costello's last screen appearance. In that same year she again appeared in Wagon Train in the episode "Matthew Lowry Story", this time having a part that ran the full episode.

On January 3, 1959, Provine appeared as Laura Winfield in the episode "The Bitter Lesson" of the NBC Western series Cimarron City. Laura Winfield is a newly arrived schoolteacher with false credentials who is plotting with a male companion to rob a stage shipment of gold, but not before Deputy Sheriff Lane Temple (series star John Smith) falls in love with her. Dan Blocker and Gregg Palmer also appear in this episode as interested suitors of the new teacher. A few weeks thereafter, she was cast in a supporting role in the episode "The Giant Killer" of the ABC/Warner Bros. Western series Sugarfoot, with Will Hutchins in the title role.

In 1959, Provine appeared as Ann Donnelly in the episode "The Confession" of another ABC/WB Western series, Colt .45, starring Wayde Preston. Charles Aidman was cast in this episode as Arthur Sibley; Don C. Harvey as Sheriff Clinter. About this time she was also cast in an episode of the ABC sitcom The Real McCoys starring Walter Brennan.

Another 1959 appearance was as "Chalmers" in the episode "Blood Money" of the CBS televised Western The Texan starring Rory Calhoun as Bill Longley and Ralph Meeker in the guest cast as Sam Kerrigan. She also guest starred in the syndicated Western series Man Without a Gun starring Rex Reason.

Provine had a starring role in two ABC/WB series: The Alaskans (1959–1960) starring Roger Moore in which she played Rocky Shaw, and The Roaring Twenties (1960–1962), in which she portrayed dazzling singer/dancer Pinky Pinkham. A profile in Time stated that "It is Dorothy’s oooohing and shimmying that have kept the series afloat." Rex Reason, from Man Without a Gun, co-starred with her in The Roaring Twenties along with Donald May, John Dehner, Mike Road, and Gary Vinson. Provine recorded an album of songs from the show, and had two hit singles in the UK Singles Chart — "Don't Bring Lulu" (number 17 in 1961) and "Crazy Words, Crazy Tune" (number 45 in 1962).

She guest-starred in the 25th episode of The Gallant Men called "Tommy", which aired in March 1963. Her character name was Joyce Adams, a singer who entertained the troops.

In September 1965, Provine starred in the two-part episode "Alexander the Greater" that opened the second season of The Man from U.N.C.L.E. TV series, starring Robert Vaughn and David McCallum alongside Rip Torn and David Opatoshu, later repackaged as the theatrical feature One Spy Too Many (1966).

Provine's best-known film role was as  Emeline Marcus-Finch, beleaguered wife of Milton Berle's character in Stanley Kramer's epic comedy It's a Mad, Mad, Mad, Mad World (1963). She also appeared in  Good Neighbor Sam (1964) with Jack Lemmon, The Great Race (1965) with Tony Curtis and Jack Lemmon, Walt Disney's That Darn Cat! (1965), Kiss the Girls and Make Them Die (1966), Who's Minding the Mint? (1967) with Walter Brennan, and Never a Dull Moment (1968) with Dick Van Dyke.

Personal life and death

In 1968, Provine married the film and television director Robert Day and retired from acting, apart from occasional guest roles on television. The couple moved to Bainbridge Island, Washington, about 1990, where they resided with their son. Provine was reclusive in retirement and indulged her love of reading and movies and occasionally drove around the island with her husband.

According to the Roger Moore website, during the filming of The Alaskans (1959–1960) Provine had an affair with Roger Moore.

Provine died of emphysema on April 25, 2010 in Bremerton, Washington.

Filmography

Film

Television

DiscographyThe Roaring 20's, 1960 Warner Bros.: WM 4035 (W1394). Musical direction by Sandy Courage. Included two songs which were A sides of hit singles: Don't Bring Lulu and Crazy Words - Crazy Tune.The Vamp of The Roaring 20s - Vol. 2, 1961 Warner Bros.: WM 4053. Musical direction by Sandy Courage.Oh You Kid!,'' 1962 Warner Bros.: 1962 Warner Bros.: W 1466. With Joe "Fingers" Carr.

References

External links

 

1935 births
2010 deaths
People from Deadwood, South Dakota
Deaths from emphysema
American film actresses
American women singers
American television actresses
People from Bremerton, Washington
Actresses from South Dakota
University of Washington School of Drama alumni
Singers from South Dakota
20th-century American actresses
Warner Bros. contract players
21st-century American women
United Service Organizations entertainers